San Miguel Topilejo is a community in Tlalpan Delegacion, Mexico City, Mexico. It is one of the eight original villages in Tlalpan. The San Miguel Arcángel temple is in this community. Corn, oat, and vegetable cultivation form the backbone of its economy. The Corn Fair (feria del elote) is held here.

Escuela Preparatoria Tlalpan II "Otilio Montaño" is located in the community.

References

External links
Citypopulation.de

Neighborhoods in Mexico City
Tlalpan